3 Avengers (also spelled as The 3 Avengers and The Three Avengers) is a 1964 Italian  peplum film written and directed  by Gianfranco Parolini and starring Alan Steel.

Cast   
Alan Steel as Ursus 
 Mimmo Palmara as The False Ursus 
 Lisa Gastoni as  Alina 
 Rosalba Neri as  Demora 
 Carlo Tamberlani as King Igos 
 Gianni Rizzo as  Teomocus 
 Vassili Karis as  Prince Darius
 Vincenzo Maggio as  Manina 
 Nello Pazzafini as  Samur 
 Orchidea De Santis as Blonde Girl
  as Pico
 Enzo Maggio as Manina
  as Aleco

References

External links

    
Peplum films 
1964 adventure films
Films directed by Gianfranco Parolini
Sword and sandal films
1960s Italian films